Olivera Krivokapić (born 6 September 1962) is a former Serbian and Yugoslav professional basketball player who participated at the EuroBasket 1987 for Yugoslavia, where she won silver medal.

References

External links
Profile at FIBA

1962 births
Living people
People from Kotor
Serbian women's basketball players
Yugoslav women's basketball players
ŽKK Partizan players
Serbs of Montenegro
Universiade gold medalists for Yugoslavia
Universiade bronze medalists for Yugoslavia
Universiade medalists in basketball